Nothing to fear but fear itself may refer to:

 A phrase from the  1933 inaugural address of Franklin D. Roosevelt
 "Nothing to Fear but Fear Itself", an episode of the television series The Golden Girls
 "Nothing to Fear (But Fear Itself)", a song by Oingo Boingo on the 1982 album Nothing to Fear
 "Nothing to fear but Fear Itself", an episode of the American-Canadian television series Painkiller Jane
 "Nothing to fear but Fear Itself", an episode of the Canadian television series Class of the Titans

See also
 "Cowgirls gone Wild: Nothing to fear but fear itself", an episode of Wild Things
 Fear Itself (disambiguation)
 Nothing to Fear (disambiguation)